KIQZ (92.7 FM) is a radio station broadcasting an active rock format. It is licensed to Rawlins, Wyoming, United States. The station is owned by Mt. Rushmore Broadcasting, Inc. It previously featured programing from AP Radio and Jones Radio Network. KIQZ was simulcasted on sister station KRAL also from Rawlins. KIQZ is currently broadcasting under special temporary authority.

History
The station was assigned the call letters KIAJ on August 13, 1981. On November 4, 1981, the station changed its call sign to the current KIQZ.

In the late 2000s, the station fell silent citing financial and staffing difficulties. The station filed for resumption of operations twice, once in 2011, and a year later in 2012. Days after the resumption of operations, the stations fell silent again, similar to the situation on AM sister station KRAL.
The station had until June 22, 2013 to resume operations, otherwise its license would be cancelled and penalties would be issued from the FCC.

The station and its sister again requested a special temporary authority (STA) to go silent in early 2013 as a result of employees "unexpectedly" resigning and the difficulty finding new employees at the remote location.

The station and its sister station KRAL AM returned to air status in January 2016 broadcasting a mix of the 90s/2000s/now format programmed by station staff. The stations are currently under new management, but not new ownership, and broadcasting an active rock format under FCC STA authority while transmission facilities are being reconstructed.

Signal
KIQZ covered most of central Carbon County, much like its sister station KRAL. It could only be heard to the Sweetwater County/Carbon County line. The station went silent in the late 2000s, citing technical limitations, but that may not have been the only reason (see next section). It is currently operating at less power from a temporary location near the studio.

FCC fines and penalties
Since the station's change of ownership from "Elk Mountain Broadcasting" to current owner "Mount Rushmore Broadcasting", KIQZ, and its sister station, KRAL (AM 1240) have been fined by the FCC many times.  Past penalties include a $20,000 fine for "failing to maintain the operational readiness of the EAS (Emergency Alert System) equipment (see FCC Rules/11.35(a)), as well as other equipment issues and violations and failure to maintain a complete public records file."

Sources connected to the FCC say that more and significantly higher fines/penalties are probable. They continue by stating that any station owned or operated by Mt. Rushmore Broadcasting will "not likely" have their licenses renewed once they expire, due to the history of "past violations and cavalier attitude(s) towards following and maintaining" rules and regulations, and that this and other M.R.B. stations could have their broadcasting rights taken away "at almost any moment". Since this is an all-but-done set of circumstances, Mt. Rushmore Broadcasting's owner, Jan Charles Gray has been operating all of M.R.B.'s stations with little or no staff, whatsoever. On or around July 10, 2010, Gray filed with the FCC documentation that stated KRAL had gone off the air due to "technical" problems. What he failed to do was inform the FCC that the station had been in a non-broadcasting mode for well over 18 months prior to this filing. Several past and current employees of M.R.B. had informed Gray of the station's failing broadcast signal as far back as 2008, with Gray responding "No one listens to A.M. radio anymore, anyway."

Dating to 1998, managers were terminated for failure to maintain EAS equipment, as well as failing to notify the station owner of the problems in hopes it would appease the FCC. The FM transmitter was not operational from 2003 to 2006. At that time, a replacement transmitter was brought in however with a history of non-payment, broadcast contractors were not willing to install it without payment in advance. This payment never materialized and KIQZ stayed running on exciter power only until 2013*. Power was cut at the studio and transmitter site due to non payment. The Bureau of Land Management then reverted control of the land the FM tower site sat on to another owner. The land under the transmitter site for KRAL received a legal filing. This barred any Mount Rushmore Broadcasting employee from accessing the tower. In January 2016, work to restore the facilities to normal operations resumed, however both KIQZ and its AM sister have yet to find suitable locations for permanent facilities. KIQZ is broadcasting from a sign post outside the studios. KRAL is broadcasting from a wire antenna near the studios as well at significantly lower power than licensed.

* An exciter is the piece of equipment at the signal tower that provides low power output to the transmitter itself and determines what frequency is being broadcast.

References

External links

IQZ
Radio stations established in 1981
Carbon County, Wyoming
Active rock radio stations in the United States